Alexis Galarneau (born 2 March 1999) is a Canadian tennis player.

Galarneau has a career-high singles ranking by the ATP of world No. 204, achieved on November 21, 2022. He also has a career-high ATP doubles ranking of 362, achieved on October 3, 2022.

College career
Galarneau played college tennis at North Carolina State University.

Professional career

2021-22: ATP, Masters & top 250 debuts, Davis Cup champion
Galarneau made his ATP main-draw debut at the 2021 National Bank Open after receiving a wildcard into the doubles main draw with partner Félix Auger-Aliassime. 

He made his singles debut the following year in 2022, when he lost to 15th-seeded Grigor Dimitrov in the first round. As a result, he made his top 250 debut at world No. 238 on 1 August 2022.

ATP Challenger and ITF Futures finals

Singles: 2 (1–2)

Doubles: 2 (1–1)

References

External links

1999 births
Living people
Canadian male tennis players
NC State Wolfpack men's tennis players
Racket sportspeople from Quebec
Sportspeople from Laval, Quebec
20th-century Canadian people
21st-century Canadian people